Live Oak is a census-designated place (CDP) in Santa Cruz County, California between the cities of Santa Cruz and Capitola and north of the former Union Pacific railroad. The population was 17,038 at the 2020 census. The population of the greater Live Oak area, including Twin Lakes and Pleasure Point, was 27,921.

Geography
Live Oak is located at  (36.981363, -121.980476).

According to the United States Census Bureau, the CDP has a total area of 3.2 square miles (8.4 km2), all of it land.

History

For several thousand years, the Awaswas-speaking Ohlone people inhabited the area from Half Moon Bay to Aptos, including the area now known as Live Oak. When missionaries established the Mission Santa Cruz in 1791, they noted "an area to the east of the San Lorenzo River "in sight of the Sea" that was crisscrossed by "steep gulches containing running water" and three "reed-lined" lagoons. Spanish colonial settlers, who later established the secular pueblo of Villa de Branciforte on the east side of the San Lorenzo, ran their herds of cattle and horses in the "common lands" of this area.

In 1834 and 1837, territorial governors divided these lands between two brothers, Alejandro and Francisco Rodriguez. Alejandro Rodriguez was granted Rancho Arroyo del Rodeo, named for the rodeo (cattle roundup) area located in a low-lying natural amphitheater along Rodeo Creek. (These grounds were later filled in during the construction of Highway 1.) Francisco Rodriguez was granted a rancho bearing the name "Los Esteros" (never patented) because of the sizeable estuaries forming two of its boundaries. Originally known as Twin Lakes, the westernmost of the "twins" is now the Santa Cruz Harbor.

With the discovery of gold in California in 1848 and American statehood in 1849, legal maneuvering turned the Rodriguez brothers' holdings over to a handful of white settler-farmers. Their farms produced wheat, oats, and barley, supporting small households of adobe and rough-cut lumber. The farmers prospered, establishing a Grange Hall and, in 1872, a small schoolhouse called the "Live Oak School", named for the evergreen live oak trees that dot the area. The Live Oak School District has maintained a facility at this location, now the intersection of 17th Avenue and Capitola Road, to the present day.

By the start of the 20th century, fifty years of wheat and oat farming had depleted the soil such that farmers turned to cultivating fruits and vegetables.  Owing to the irrigation needs of these crops, these farms eventually failed and were replaced by a large poultry operation near the present-day intersection of Capitola Road and Soquel Drive, and a floriculture bulb nursery (specializing in callas, narcissus, freesias and begonias) near the present-day intersection of 17th Avenue and East Cliff Drive.

Around 1910, two Santa Cruz real estate agents, the brothers Frank and David Wilson, purchased and subdivided several of the old 19th century wheat farms. The layout and shape of these lots has left a distinctive mark on the area's subsequent development. A feed mill to serve the area soon followed.

Egg and poultry prices plummeted in the early years of the Great Depression, and this difficulty was compounded by a double plague of Pullorum Disease and Coccidiosis, which swept through the chicken coops of Live Oak in 1931.

Paved roads and utilities were brought to the area during the 1940s, which also saw the incorporation of Capitola to the east. Bulb nurseries, particularly those specializing in begonias, thrived throughout this period and into the 1950s, when the area was beginning to develop into a residential suburb of Santa Cruz. The west-to-east serial numbering of Live Oak's north–south streets during that period reflected the expectation that the area would soon be annexed to the city of Santa Cruz. Annexation never came, and a movement for Live Oak to incorporate itself as a municipality was abandoned too, in light of the expense of providing the needed services to the area. In the 1970s, Capitola expanded westward, incorporating the tax-rich commercial neighborhood along 41st Avenue. Residential and commercial development in Live Oak continued at a steady pace, under the direction of Santa Cruz County.

Live Oak today

Sporadic infill development in Live Oak over the last half century has contributed to the area's eclectic patchwork of trailer parks, ranch-style houses, townhome condominium complexes, and single-family homes in cul-de-sacs, with the 2½ acre plots and their two-bedroom kit houses left over from the chicken farming days (the farms are no longer operating).

Live Oak has no downtown center, but 17th Avenue between Highway 1 and East Cliff Drive is the address for several schools, the Santa Cruz Live Oak Grange Hall, the Fire Department, a Santa Cruz County Sheriff's Department, the Family Swim Center, and the majority of Live Oak's business establishments.

While identified as part of Live Oak, Pleasure Point, Santa Cruz, California, has its own history and developed out of El Rancho Arroyo del Rodeo rather than Rancho Encinalitos.

Demographics

2010
The 2010 United States Census reported that Live Oak had a population of 17,158. The racial makeup of Live Oak was 12,636 (73.6%) White, 240 (1.4%) African American, 171 (1.0%) Native American, 773 (4.5%) Asian, 41 (0.2%) Pacific Islander, 2,444 (14.2%) from other races, and 853 (5.0%) from two or more races. Hispanic or Latino of any race were 4,796 persons (28.0%).

The Census reported that 16,714 people (97.4% of the population) lived in households, 193 (1.1%) lived in non-institutionalized group quarters, and 251 (1.5%) were institutionalized.

There were 6,441 households, out of which 2,083 (32.3%) had children under the age of 18 living in them, 2,669 (41.4%) were opposite-sex married couples living together, 836 (13.0%) had a female householder with no husband present, 353 (5.5%) had a male householder with no wife present.  There were 480 (7.5%) unmarried opposite-sex partnerships, and 91 (1.4%) same-sex married couples or partnerships. 1,817 households (28.2%) were made up of individuals, and 746 (11.6%) had someone living alone who was 65 years of age or older. The average household size was 2.59.  There were 3,858 families (59.9% of all households); the average family size was 3.16.

The population was spread out, with 3,668 people (21.4%) under the age of 18, 1,667 people (9.7%) aged 18 to 24, 4,738 people (27.6%) aged 25 to 44, 4,907 people (28.6%) aged 45 to 64, and 2,178 people (12.7%) who were 65 years of age or older.  The median age was 38.8 years. For every 100 females, there were 96.0 males.  For every 100 females age 18 and over, there were 92.5 males.

The homeowner vacancy rate was 1.8%; the rental vacancy rate was 1.9%.  9,291 people (54.1% of the population) lived in owner-occupied housing units and 7,423 people (43.3%) lived in rental housing units.

2000
As of the census of 2000, there were 16,628 people, 6,216 households, and 3,785 families residing in the Live Oak CDP. The racial makeup of Live Oak was 77.61% White, 1.37% African American, 1.02% Native American, 3.82% Asian, 0.11% Pacific Islander, 11.07% from other races, and 5.01% from two or more races. Hispanic or Latino of any race were 21.98% of the population.

Live Oak comprised 6,216 households, out of which 32.8% had children under the age of 18 living with them, 42.1% were married couples living together, 13.6% had a female householder with no husband present, and 39.1% were non-families. 26.9% of all households were made up of individuals, and 10.9% had someone living alone who was 65 years of age or older.  The average household size in Live Oak was 2.58 and the average family size was 3.11.

In Live Oak the population was spread out, with 23.5% under the age of 18, 9.6% from 18 to 24, 32.3% from 25 to 44, 23.0% from 45 to 64, and 11.7% who were 65 years of age or older.  The median age was 36 years. For every 100 females, there were 94.8 males.  For every 100 females age 18 and over, there were 91.1 males.

The median income for a household in Live Oak was $47,949; the median income for a family was $53,607. Men had a median income of $39,921 versus $32,955 for women. The per capita income for Live Oak was $23,333.  About 7.3% of families and 10.1% of the population were below the poverty line, including 12.6% of those under age 18 and 9.6% of those age 65 or over.

Government

See also
Live Oak School District

References

Census-designated places in Santa Cruz County, California
Census-designated places in California